Ještěd is the highest mountain of the Ještěd–Kozákov Ridge in the north of the Czech Republic, at . It is the symbol of the city of Liberec.

On the summit is the Ještěd Tower restaurant, hotel and television tower, designed by Karel Hubáček, accessible by road or cable car (Ještěd Cable car). The mountain also has a ski resort. From the summit there are views to Germany and Poland.

Location
Ještěd is the highest mountain of the Ještěd–Kozákov Ridge within the Bohemian Massif. The eastern slopes and the summit lie in the municipal territory of Liberec (Horní Hanychov part), the western slopes belong to the municipality of Světlá pod Ještědem.

History

The origin of the mountain's name is uncertain, it is probably from the term Ash mountain, a once dominant tree species in the area. The Czech name for the mountain was first recorded in 1545 as Jesstied. The German form of the name, Jeschke, was first mentioned in 1565.

As far back as 1838 the summit hosted a crude stone that serves as a landmark to this day. The first hut on the summit was erected as early as 1844. In the 1860s, the mountain ridge was Station No. 4 of the first order of the Royal Saxon triangulation. For this reason a measuring station was built on the summit.

In 1906, the Mountain Club, a mountain hotel, was built. The Jeschke Horní Hanychov cable car to the summit was opened in 1933.

On 23 August 1940, at midnight, a Heinkel He 111 from the Second (Lion) Squadron from Lüneburg crashed into the mountain near the summit and tore a long swathe in the woods. This accident killed the four crew.

The old mountain hotel burned down in 1963.

Between 1966 and 1973, a futuristic hotel, with a 100-metre-high television tower, was built that was designed by the architect, Karel Hubáček. For the construction of the TV tower, Hubáček was awarded the Auguste Perret Prize. The modern building acts as an observation tower, transmission tower, hotel and restaurant.

In 2009, an element of the Nordic World Ski Championships took place on Ještěd.

The ski jumping hills

In Ještěd there are two ski jumping hills, The World Championships 2009 were hosted there. The K-134 and the K-90. Roman Koudelka has the hill record in the K-134, with 143 metres. Anssi Koivuranta jumped 106.5 metres in the K-90, which is the hill record on this hill.

References

External links
 Geographical info about the mountain
 Ještěd Hotel
 Ještěd sport webpage
 Ski klub Ještěd

Mountains and hills of the Czech Republic
One-thousanders of the Czech Republic
Ski areas and resorts in the Czech Republic
Mountain peaks of the Sudetes
Observation towers in the Czech Republic
Liberec District